Herbert Lübking (born October 23, 1941 in Minden-Dankersen) is a former West German handball player who competed in the 1972 Summer Olympics.

In 1972 he was part of the West German team which finished sixth in the Olympic tournament. He played all six matches and scored nine goals.

References

1941 births
Living people
German male handball players
Olympic handball players of West Germany
Handball players at the 1972 Summer Olympics
People from Minden
Sportspeople from Detmold (region)